The National League Championship Series (NLCS), also known as the National League Pennant, is a best-of-seven playoff and one of two League Championship Series comprising the penultimate round of Major League Baseball's (MLB) postseason. It is contested by the winners of the two National League (NL) Division Series. The winner of the NLCS wins the NL pennant and advances to the World Series, MLB's championship series, to play the winner of the American League's (AL) Championship Series. The NLCS began in 1969 as a best-of-five playoff and used this format until 1985, when it changed to its current best-of-seven format.

History
Prior to 1969, the National League champion (the "pennant winner") was determined by the best win–loss record at the end of the regular season. There were four ad hoc three-game playoff series due to ties under this formulation (in 1946, 1951, 1959, and 1962).

A structured postseason series began in 1969, when both the National and American Leagues were reorganized into two divisions each, East and West. The two division winners within each league played each other in a best-of-five series to determine who would advance to the World Series. In 1985, the format changed to best-of-seven.

The NLCS and ALCS, since the expansion to seven games, are always played in a 2–3–2 format: games 1, 2, 6, and 7 are played in the stadium of the team that has home field advantage, and games 3, 4, and 5 are played in the stadium of the team that does not. Home field advantage is given to the team that has the better record, except a division champion would always get home advantage over a Wild Card team. From 1969 to 1993, home field advantage was alternated between divisions each year regardless of regular season record and from 1995 to 1997 home field advantage was predetermined before the season.

In 1981, a one-off division series was held due to a split season caused by a players' strike.

In 1994, the league was restructured into three divisions, with the three division winners and a wild card team advancing to a best-of-five postseason round, the now-permanent National League Division Series (NLDS). The winners of that round advance to the best-of-seven NLCS.

The Milwaukee Brewers, an American League team between 1969 and 1997, and the Houston Astros, a National League team between 1962 and 2012, are the only franchises to play in both the ALCS and NLCS. The Astros are the only team to have won both an NLCS (2005) and an ALCS (2017, 2019, 2021, and 2022). The Astros made four NLCS appearances before moving to the AL in 2013. Every current National League franchise has appeared in the NLCS and all teams except the Brewers have won an NL Pennant via the NLCS.

For the first time in history, two wild card teams played in the 2022 National League Championship Series

Championship Trophy
The Warren C. Giles Trophy is awarded to the NLCS winner. Warren Giles served as president of the National League from 1951 to 1969.

Most Valuable Player Award
See: League Championship Series Most Valuable Player Award#National League winners
A Most Valuable Player (MVP) award is given to the outstanding player in the NLCS. No MVP award is given for Division Series play.

The MVP award has been given to a player on the losing team twice, in 1986 to Mike Scott of the Houston Astros and in 1987 to Jeffrey Leonard of the San Francisco Giants.

Although the National League began its LCS MVP award in 1977, the American League did not begin its LCS MVP award until 1980. The winners are listed in several locations:
 in the below NLCS results table, in the "Series MVP" column
 in the article League Championship Series Most Valuable Player Award
 on the MLB website

Results

Appearances by team

Years of appearance
In the sortable table below, teams are ordered first by number of wins, then by number of appearances, and finally by year of first appearance. In the "Season(s)" column, bold years indicate winning appearances.

Frequent matchups

See also

List of National League pennant winners
List of National League Wild Card winners
National League Division Series
American League Championship Series

Notes

References

External links
 League Championship Series History at Baseball Almanac
 World Series and MLB Playoffs at Baseball-Reference.com
 Post-Season Games Directory at Retrosheet

 
Recurring sporting events established in 1969
Annual events in Major League Baseball